Westlake in Canberra is a ghost town on the outskirts of Yarralumla, Australian Capital Territory. Westlake used to be a suburb of Canberra from 1922 until 1965.<ref>Warden, Ian. [http://www.canberratimes.com.au/act-news/canberra-life/ganggang-rediscovering-canberras-lost-suburb-of-westlake-20141116-11mlw0.html,Rediscovering Canberra's lost suburb of Westlake"], The Canberra Times, Canberra, 17 November 2014. Retrieved on 30 July 2015.</ref> Remnants of constructions and buildings are still visible today.

At its peak it had a population of around 700. In 2014, Pip Buining and Louise Morris created a theatrical event called Anthology celebrating the township. She says "the site is Ngunnawal land, guru bung dhaura'' (stony ground) a traditional pathway, and from the 1920s was the site of one of the camps created to house the workers building the new city of Canberra. Tents and a hall were erected at Westlake followed by 61 temporary cottages, designed by architect H. M. Rolland and built in 1923, for married tradesmen, and their families, who came to Canberra to build the infrastructure for the new Federal Capital of Australia."

She continues "Westlake was planned and built. Families were moved in, went to work, built friendships, got married, had children, created gardens, held funerals. The temporary suburb became a community. But when it had served its purpose and the workers were no longer required, the houses were sold off one by one and taken away on the backs of trucks. Westlake was erased."

Westlake remains a tourist attraction today. It sits in a picturesque corner of the nation's capital, surrounded by embassies and bush.

References

External links 

 Dave Reid's site
 Hidden Canberra

Suburbs of Canberra
Ghost towns in Australia